The Aurora Awards are granted annually by the Canadian SF and Fantasy Association and SFSF Boreal Inc. The Award for Best Short Fiction (French: La meilleure fiction courte), was first recognized in 1986 as a separate category from Best Long-Form and was first granted as the Award for Best Short-Form (French: Meilleure nouvelle), one granted to an English-language work and one to a French-language work, but did not become a dedicated category until 1989. In 1997 it was renamed to the Award for Best Short-Form Work and then again in 2012 it became the Award for Best Short Story, when the Prix Aurora and Prix Boreal combined, before adopting the name Award for Best Short Fiction a year later.

Robert J. Sawyer holds the highest number of awards for the English-language prize at 5 awards. Élisabeth Vonarburg and Yves Meynard hold the highest number of awards for the French-language prize at five each.

No winner was given in 1986, but a shortlist was created.

English-language Award

Winners and nominees

  *   Winners and joint winners

French-language Award

Winners and nominees

  *   Winners and joint winners

References

Short Fiction
Short story awards